This is a list of episodes for the television series The Streets of San Francisco, which ran from 1972 to 1977; a Made-for-TV-movie sequel aired in 1992.

Series overview

Pilot (1972)

Episodes

Season 1 (1972–73)

Season 2 (1973–74)

Season 3 (1974–75)

Season 4 (1975–76)

Season 5 (1976–77)

Television film (1992)
According to the weekly Nielsen ratings for the period ofJanuary 27 – February 2, 1992, the TV movie received a 13.2 rating and 20 share; 18.9 million viewers watched, ranking #23 out of 84 network programs aired.

Home releases
The following DVD sets have been released by Paramount Home Video.

The full 5 seasons is now available as a box set on DVD. The box set in region 1.

References

Sources
 

Streets of San Francisco